Boora  is a ward, situated in Bikita District, Masvingo Province in south-eastern part of Zimbabwe.

Bibliography 

 Wards of Zimbabwe: Mutikizizi, Maramani, Dendele, Masera, Zimbabwe, Dite Ii, Hwali, Marozva, Alisupi, Mazungunye, Nyarushiri, Siyoka Ii, General Books, 2010.

Wards of Zimbabwe
Bikita District
Populated places in Masvingo Province